See also : Certified First Responder and Emergency medical responder

In France, the pre-hospital care is either performed by first responders from the fire department (sapeurs-pompiers, most emergency situations) or from a private ambulance company (relative emergency at home), or by a medical team that includes a physician, a nurse and an ambulance technician (called "smur"). The intermediate scale, the firefighter nurse (infirmier sapeur-pompier, ISP), is only a recent evolution and is performed by nurses specially trained acting with emergency protocols; these nurses are the French equivalent of the paramedics. The first responders are thus the most frequent answer to emergency calls.

First aid associations (about 15 nationwide associations, including the French Red Cross, St John ambulance, order of Malta and the volunteers of the French Civil Protection) also train their volunteers as first responders; the top diploma (PSE 2) is exactly the same as the firefighters. They usually act in preventive first aid post, e.g. for concerts, sporting or cultural events.

The volunteers first responders can take part of an emergency rescue team in case of disaster; due to the bad response time (usually some hours to gather the teams), they usually deal with minor casualties, but could theoretically act in first line. In some places (e.g. in Paris), the volunteers take part of the public rescue and partly replace the firemen during the weekends.

Diploma
The lowest diploma required to be first responder in France is the PSE 1 (Premiers Secours en Equipe de niveau 1, "Team First Aid level 1") since the large reform of 2007, but the next level : the PSE 2 (Premiers Secours en Equipe de niveau 2, "Team First Aid level 2") is advised to be fully operational with victims.

Before 2007, the diploma was the CFAPSE (certificat de formation aux activités des premiers secours en équipe, "certificate of training to team first aid"). This new degree (PSE 2) is more adapted to the new responsibilities of first responders. To get the PSE 2, you need to have the PSE 1 (intermediate level, 35 h of training) and to have fulfil another 35 hours of training. So, at all, a PSE 2 first responder had followed 70 h of training. In addition, every CFR (PSE 1 and 2) must also follow every year 6 hours of continuing training.

The first responders activity is called secourisme ("rescuism") or prompt secours ("fast aid"), to make the difference with the premiers secours ("first aid") performed by the bystanders (although the name of the diploma contains the words premiers secours...).

Education

Before 2007 : CFAPSE
The organization has changed in 2007. The following describes the situation between 1991 and 2006

The CFAPSE (50-60h) is made of ten modules:
 E 1. - the CFR team (team work, organisation of the civil defense and integration in an emergency operation, as professional rescuer or as community emergency response team)
 E 2. - Assessment and evaluation and voice radio communication
 E 3. - emergency casualty movement and patient positions for transportation
 E 4. - Casualty lifting
 E 5. - Casualty movement
 E 6. - Bleedings, wounds, burns
 E 7. - airway permeability (recovery position made by three CFR after motorcycle helmet removal and neck immobilisation by a cervical collar, mouth vacuum aspiration of mucosity)
 E 8. - Mechanical ventilation with devices (bag valve mask)
 E 9. - Oxygen first aid, cardiopulmonary resuscitation and Automated external defibrillation
 E 10. - Immobilisations (splints)
It is possible to follow only a partial course (12h) with the E1, E2, E7, E8 and E9 modules. This "first-level" course is called the attestation de formation complémentaire aux premiers secours avec matériel–AFCPSAM (additional first aid course with equipment).

Since 2007 : PSE 1 & 2
Since 2007, there are two levels : PSE 1 and PSE 2, the PSE 2 is the equivalent of the former CFAPSE. A PSE 1 first responder is allowed to work with PSE 2 CFR, nevertheless, he has less knowledge than a PSE 2, so will only be a help to a confirmed PSE 2 worker.

Program for the PSE 1 : Premiers Secours en Equipe de niveau 1 (Team First Aid level 1) - 35 hours
1) The first aider
2) The rescue link
3) Security aspects
4) The alert
5) Obstruction of the airway
6) Bleedings, wounds, burns 
7) Unconsciousness
8) Cardiac arrest
9) Automated external defibrillation
10) Vital emergency
11) Uneasiness
12) Skin injuries
13) Bone injuries
14) Drowning
15) Supervision of the victim
Program for the PSE 2 : Premiers Secours en Equipe de niveau 2 (Team First Aid level 2) - 35 hours
1) The team rescue worker
2) Hygiene and asepsis
3) Victim evaluation
4) Care according to the circumstances
5) How the victim is specifically affected
6) Psychological pain
7) Bandaging
8) Immobilisations
9) Moving the victims
10) Hospital porter
11) Situation with more than one victim
12) Summing up

Emergency medical services in France